Joseph Carne-Ross (1846-1911) was a Portuguese-born physician and science-fiction author. He studied medicine at the University of Edinburgh, being awarded an MD in 1882 entitled 'Observations upon the modes of treatment of pleurisy with effusion: with special reference to the therapeutic value of thoracentesis'. He published a series of letters presenting the results of experiments using cinnamon to treat cancer, scarlet fever, measles and influenza in The Lancet medical journal in 1894.

He was the author of the science-fiction novel Quintura: Its Singular People and Remarkable Customs (London: John and Robert Maxwell, 1886), which presents a description of an Island governed on classless but Eugenic lines by physicians, who also serve as the culture's police force, applying scientific advances in medicine to predict accurately when and where individuals are about to commit crimes. This prefigures the use of the concept of precognition in the science-fiction short story The Minority Report published by Philip K Dick in 1956 and made into the film Minority Report directed by Steven Spielberg in 2002.

He married Kate Selwyn. They have three sons and one daughter, including Stewart Buckle Carne Ross, the Postmasters-General of Hong Kong.

References 

1846 births
1911 deaths
19th-century Scottish medical doctors
20th-century Scottish medical doctors
People from Madeira
Alumni of the University of Edinburgh Medical School